Chlorotrifluoropropane (also known as 1-chloro-3,3,3-trifluoropropane or R-253) is a hydrochlorofluorocarbon with the chemical formula ) . It is a volatile derivative propane. It appears as a colourless, odorless non-flammable liquid.

Toxicity and Reactivity 
Chlorotrifluoropropane is acutely toxic and upon heating to decomposition, it will emit chlorine and fluorine gases, both of which can be toxic to living organisms at low concentrations. Chlorotrifluoropropane will not readily undergo a reaction with water or air.

See also 

 F-Gases
 List of Refrigerants

References 

Hydrochlorofluorocarbons